Asterigos: Curse of the Stars is a third-person hack and slash role-playing video game with Soulslike elements. It was developed by Taiwan-based Acme GameStudio, published by TinyBuild, and was released on October 11, 2022, for PlayStation 4, PlayStation 5, Xbox One, Xbox Series X/S and Windows. Set in a fantasy world, it follows a young woman named Hilda, who travels to Aphes, a cursed city that is stuck in time, to find her missing father and tribespeople.

The game received mixed reviews from critics, who praised its graphics, combat and story, but thought the game lacked polish, with inconsistent voiced scenes and overly easy bosses.

Reception 

The game received an aggregate score of 73/100 on Metacritic for its Windows version, indicating "mixed or average reviews".

Ryan Costa of RPGamer rated the game 3.5/5 points, calling the game's scope expansive, but criticizing the lack of lip sync during dialog as immersion breaking. He remarked that the game was both beautiful and had a strong combat system, but that leveling up could make bosses too easy, and some quest items were overly obtuse to find. Describing the game as tough, he nevertheless called it approachable, saying that it never felt unfair.

Adam Vitale of RPGSite rated the game 7/10 points, saying that he enjoyed the game more than he expected to, although he called its dialog excessive and its translation awkward, also criticizing the fact that the game was only partially voiced. He described the narrative as conceptually interesting, but with a flawed execution. He praised the game's art style and aesthetics, calling them "respectable" and "charming". Keigo Kino of IGN Japan also rated the game 7/10 points, calling its graphics and music excellent, but noting that the combat felt "cheap", like an "unbalanced Soulsborne title".

Chris Shive of Hardcore Gamer rated the PlayStation 5 version of Asterigos 3.5/5 points, calling it challenging but more accessible than most Soulslikes, and saying that, while the gameplay was enjoyable, there was "room for more polish". He stated that, since it tries to combine traditional RPGs and Souls games, it would not totally appeal to fans of either, but could be a "good time" to those without a "purist" mentality.

References

External links 

2022 video games
Fantasy video games
Hack and slash role-playing games
Indie video games
PlayStation 4 games
PlayStation 5 games
Single-player video games
Soulslike video games
TinyBuild games
Video games developed in Taiwan
Video games featuring female protagonists
Windows games
Xbox One games
Xbox Series X and Series S games